A referendum on the transfer of church property was held in Latvia on 1 and 2 September 1923, the first time a referendum had been held in the country. Voters were asked whether the government should be stopped from transferring the Lutheran St James's Church in Riga to the Roman Catholic Church. Although a large majority voted for the proposal, voter turnout was well below the level required, and the church building was subsequently given to the Catholic Church.

Background

The  government led by Prime Minister Zigfrīds Anna Meierovics had started legislating for the transfer of Baltic German St James's Church to the Roman Catholic Church as well as forcing the Lutheran Church to share Riga Cathedral with the Catholics. The moves were vigorously opposed by Paul Schiemann, a prominent defender of minority rights, who claimed the bill would "abandon the principles of a state of culture and law" during a parliamentary debate.

Schiemann attracted international sympathy for the Lutheran Church's fight, and managed to force the country's first ever referendum. However, supporters of the transfer called for a boycott of the referendum.

Results

Aftermath
Although the referendum was passed by a large margin, turnout was just 21.4%. The referendum had required 400,000 to vote in favour for it to succeed, but achieved only just over half the number.

Subsequently the church building was given over to the Roman Catholic Church, who took it over as their cathedral the following May. The Lutherans were also forced to share Riga Cathedral with the Catholics.

See also
Article 7 of the Concordat of 1922
1931 Latvian Riga Cathedral referendum

References

1923 referendums
1923 in Latvia
Referendums in Latvia